The Extremaduran Army, was a military formation of the Spanish Republican Army during the last phase of the Spanish Civil War. It was part of the Central Region Army Group (GERC). The Republican forces deployed at the Extremaduran Front were under its jurisdiction. They guarded the westernmost end of the Republican territory, an area that saw long periods of inactivity between the major battles.

History 
The Extremaduran Army was established in the fall 1937 as a detached formation of the Southern Army (Ejército del Sur) after its disbandment. It was initially led by Lt. Colonel Joaquín Pérez Salas as Commander in Chief, who would be soon replaced by Colonel Ricardo Burillo. The general headquarters were in the town of Almadén.  

In July 1938 during the Battle of Mérida pocket the Extremaduran Army suffered heavy losses in human lives and materiel at the hands of the rebel armies. The battle included a swift and well-coordinated pincer movement from the south and from the north. Some historians consider that the long lulls of inactivity at the Extremaduran front had left the troops ill-prepared for such a major attack. Having led the army during the debacle, Colonel Burillo was replaced by Colonel Adolfo Prada Vaquero who was able to somehow regroup the shattered Extremaduran Army and put somewhat of a halt to the Francoist offensive. General Antonio Escobar Huerta took over the command towards the end of 1938. 

In January 1939 the Extremaduran Army launched a belated offensive with the Battle of Valsequillo, also known as "Battle of Peñarroya", in the Córdoba-Extremadura front. At the beginning the battle spelt some success for the loyalist side, but it turned to failure after a few weeks of unfruitful combats. Finally, the Extremaduran Army was disbanded in March 1939 owing to the end of the war and the surrender of the Spanish Republic.

Order of Battle 
July–August 1938

Leaders 
Commanders
 Lt. Colonel Joaquín Pérez Salas;
 Colonel Ricardo Burillo;
 Colonel Adolfo Prada Vaquero;
 Brigadier General Antonio Escobar Huerta;

Chiefs of Staff
 Lt. Colonel Joaquín Alonso García;
 Lt. Colonel Javier Linares Aranzabe;
 Colonel Eduardo Sáenz de Aranaz;
 Colonel Ramón Ruiz-Fornells;

Commissar
 Nicolás Jiménez Molina, belonging to the PSOE;

Artillery General Commander
 Artillery Colonel José Valcázar Crespo;

Engineering General Commander
 Engineer Lt. Colonel Pedro Fraile Sánchez

See also
Central Region Army Group Grupo de Ejércitos de la Región Central (GERC)
Final offensive of the Spanish Civil War

References

Bibliography 
 
 
 
 
 
 
 
 Salas Larrazábal, Ramón (2006); Historia del Ejército Popular de la República. La Esfera de los Libros S.L. 
 
 Thomas, Hugh (1976); Historia de la Guerra Civil Española. Círculo de Lectores, Barcelona..
 

Military units and formations of the Spanish Civil War
Armed Forces of the Second Spanish Republic
Armies of Spain
Spanish Civil War in Extremadura
Military units and formations established in 1937
Military units and formations disestablished in 1939